Sarvesh Amte is an Indian inline speed skater, inline hockey player and speed slalom player who represented India in World Slalom Series 2012. 

He is from Belagavi, Karnataka, India. He started skating in 2010.

He is an Indian skating champion and holds more than 10 World Records in skating. 

He also played inline hockey for state level and national matches.

Competitions

References 

1994 births
Living people
Sportspeople from Karnataka
Inline speed skaters